The Bagnold number (Ba) is the ratio of grain collision stresses to viscous fluid stresses in a granular flow with interstitial Newtonian fluid, first identified by Ralph Alger Bagnold. 

The Bagnold number is defined by 

 ,

The parameter  is known as the linear concentration, and is given by

 ,

In flows with small Bagnold numbers (Ba < 40), viscous fluid stresses dominate grain collision stresses, and the flow is said to be in the "macro-viscous" regime. Grain collision stresses dominate at large Bagnold number (Ba > 450), which is known as the "grain-inertia" regime. A transitional regime falls between these two values.

See also

 Bingham plastic

References

External links
Granular Material Flows at N.A.S.A

Granularity of materials
Bubbles (physics)
Dimensionless numbers